Alexei Petrovich Khomich (14 March 1920 – 30 May 1980), nicknamed the Tiger, was a Soviet goalkeeper of the 1950s.

Club career

During his career he played for FC Dynamo Moscow and FC Dinamo Minsk. He came to international prominence following Dynamo Moscow's tour of Great Britain in 1945 when his outstanding bravery led to him receiving the nickname "Tiger". He was noted for his excellent reflexes and energetic style.

With Dynamo Moscow he won Soviet Championships in 1945 and 1949, while he was also a runner up on four other occasions. He was also remembered as a mentor to the great Lev Yashin in the early part of Yashin's career with Dynamo Moscow.

After retiring as a player, Khomich became sports photographer, working with Sovetsky Sport and Soviet Football.

Honours

Dinamo Moscow
 Soviet Top League
 Champions: 1945, 1949
 Runners-up: 1946, 1947, 1948, 1950
 Soviet Cup
 Runners-up: 1945, 1949

Dinamo Minsk
 Soviet Top League
 Third place: 1954

References

Notes

External links 
Aleksey Khomich – Soviet Legend

1920 births
1980 deaths
Association football goalkeepers
Soviet footballers
FC Dynamo Moscow players
Soviet Top League players
FC Dinamo Minsk players
Sports photographers